Fantasy Focus is a one-hour show from RotoWire.com focused on fantasy baseball on Blogtalkradio. It runs Monday through Friday at 1 PM ET. It can be heard live on Blogtalkradio/RotoWire with podcasts available later at RotoWire.com/podcast. Fantasy Focus is hosted by Jeff Erickson. From 2005 to 2008 the show ran on  XM Radio's Home Plate 175 channel. John Sickels, RotoWire's minor league expert, had hosted "Fantasy Focus" on XM 175 on Fridays, when it is often called "Down on the Farm," and now makes frequent appearances on the show.

Frequent guests
 Will Carroll
 Brandon Funston
 Ron Shandler
 Joe Sheehan

References 

Fantasy sports
Baseball culture
Fantasy Focus on Blogtalkradio
Fantasy Focus